KSKU (94.7 FM, "Hit Radio 94.7") is a radio station broadcasting a contemporary hit radio format. Licensed to Sterling, Kansas, United States, the station serves the Hutchinson, Kansas area.  The station is currently owned by Ad Astra Per Aspera Broadcasting, Inc.  The KSKU call letters have been moved to 5 different frequencies across the FM band in central Kansas since 1985. KSKU has previously broadcast on these frequencies in this order 102.1, 106.1(sister station KXKU now broadcasts on 106.1), and 97.1. As well as music, the station broadcasts several high school football and basketball games from area schools. KSKU is a member of the Jayhawk Radio Network and regularly broadcasts the Kansas Jayhawks football and men's basketball games.

Studio fire incident 
On September 2, 2011, around 2:20 AM, a fire destroyed the studios of Ad Astra Per Aspera Broadcasting, which included KSKU, as well as KWHK, KNZS, and KXKU. As a result, all four stations were off the air for nearly a month until temporary studios were set up in a nearby building. KSKU 94.7 and KNZS 100.3 returned to the air at 7:00 PM on Wednesday, September 28, 2011. Rather than rebuilding after the fire, Ad Astra per Aspera Broadcasting permanently relocated to a preexisting building.

References

External links

SKU
Contemporary hit radio stations in the United States
Radio stations established in 1985
1985 establishments in Kansas